Puerto Rawson  is a fishing port, village and municipality in Chubut Province in southern Argentina. It is located at the mouth of the Chubut River, about 5 km from the city of Rawson.

References

Populated places in Chubut Province